Porphyridiophyceae is a class of red algae.

The associated order is "Porphyridiales".

It includes the genus Porphyridium.

References

External links
 http://www.shigen.nig.ac.jp/algae_tree/PorphyridiophyceaeE.html

 
Red algae classes